The name Rathbun may refer to the following people, places or vessels:

Benjamin Rathbun (1790 - 1873), American entrepreneur
Bob Rathbun (born 1954), American sportscaster
Helen R. Rathbun (1870 - 1944), American artist
John Rathbun (1746–1782), American sailor
Kent Rathbun (born 1961), American chef
Kevin Rathbun, American chef
Mark "Marty" Rathbun (born 1957), former Scientology executive
Mary J. Rathbun (1860–1943), American zoologist
Nathaniel Rathbun (born 1992), American electronic music producer and DJ known under his stage name Audien
USS Rathburne, two ships named after John Rathbun
Rathbun, Iowa, a small town in the United States